In Full Cry is an album by the American composer, saxophonist and clarinet player Joe Maneri, with violinist Mat Maneri and the rhythm section of John Lockwood on bass and Randy Peterson on drums. It was recorded in 1996 and released on the ECM label.

Reception
The AllMusic review by Charlie Wilmoth stated: "A cursory listen might produce the opinion that the members of Maneri's quartet push bent notes too far or in the wrong direction, or that they're playing out of tune, but close listening reveals that they're simply playing by their own rules".

Track listing
All compositions by Joe Maneri, John Lockwood, Mat Maneri and Randy Peterson except as indicated
 "Coarser and Finer" (Maneri, Maneri, Peterson) - 3:02 
 "Tenderly" (Walter Gross, Jack Lawrence) - 9:33 
 "Outside the Dance Hall" - 4:47 
 "A Kind of Birth" - 5:04 
 "The Seed and All" - 4:14 
 "Pulling the Boat In" (Lockwood, Maneri, Maneri) - 2:16 
 "Nobody Knows" (Traditional) - 8:23 
 "In Full Cry" - 7:52 
 "Shaw Was a Good Man, Peewee" (Lockwood, Joe Maneri, Peterson) - 5:07 
 "Lift" (Maneri, Maneri, Peterson) - 2:19 
 "Motherless Child" (Traditional) - 3:23 
 "Prelude to a Kiss" (Duke Ellington, Irving Gordon, Irving Mills) - 6:20 
Recorded at Hardstudios in Winterthur, Switzerland in June 1996

Personnel
Joe Maneri - clarinet, alto saxophone, tenor saxophone, piano
Mat Maneri - electric 6 string violin
John Lockwood - double bass
Randy Peterson - drums, percussion

References

 

1997 albums
ECM Records albums
Joe Maneri albums